The 2022 Pan American Wrestling Championships was the 35th edition of Pan American Wrestling Championships of combined events. It was held from May 5 to 8 in Acapulco, Mexico.

The event was originally scheduled for Santiago, Chile, before being moved to Acapulco. A press release issued in February 2022 stated that "The requirement decided by the Chilean Ministry of Health did not guarantee the participation of all countries."

The top four countries not already qualified, per weight category, earned a berth into the 2023 Pan American Games.

Medal table

Team ranking

Medal overview

Men's freestyle

Greco-Roman

Women's freestyle

Participating nations 
263 wrestlers from 21 nations competed.

 (10)
 (1)
 (2)
 (23)
 (23)
 (18)
 (20)
 (1)
 (17)
 (17)
 (14)
 (10)
 (6)
 (30)
 (5)
 (3)
 (13)
 (12)
 (1)
 (30)
 (7)

References

External links
Official website

Pan American Wrestling Championships
Pan America
Sports competitions in Mexico
Pan American Wrestling Championships
Qualification tournaments for the 2023 Pan American Games